The Shkopet Hydroelectric Power Station is a hydroelectric Power Station located near the village Shkopet, Albania. It has a 24 MW power installation and an annual production of 94 GWH. Its reservoir is fed and drained by the river Mat.

See also 

 List of power stations in Albania

References

Hydroelectric power stations in Albania
Buildings and structures in Kurbin